Lieutenant-Colonel Hugh Edward Joicey, 3rd Baron Joicey (1881–1966), known as the Hon. Hugh Joicey until 1940, was a British Army officer, businessman and peer.

Career
Joicey was the second son of the coal mining magnate and Liberal Party politician James Joicey from Durham. His father was created a Baronet in 1893, and then elevated to the peerage as Baron Joicey in 1906. His elder brother James Arthur Joicey (1880–1940) succeeded to the peerage on their father's death in 1936, but left only three surviving daughters on his own death four years later, when Hugh Edward succeeded. With the inheritance came the family seat at Etal Manor on the Ford Castle and Etal Castle estate.

Joicey was commissioned into the 14th Hussars as a second-lieutenant on 3 October 1900, and served in the Second Boer War in South Africa in 1901. After the war had ended, he was promoted to lieutenant on 27 August 1902. He later served with the 1st battalion Suffolk Regiment in the First World War, gaining the rank of lieutenant-colonel. He was High Sheriff of Northumberland in 1933.

Family
Joicey married in 1921 Lady Joan Katherine Lambton (1893–1967), youngest daughter of Frederick Lambton, 4th Earl of Durham. They had two sons:
Lieutenant David Hugh Joicey (1922–1943), an officer in the Coldstream Guards, who died in Italy from wounds received in action.
Captain Michael Edward Joicey, 4th Baron Joicey (1925–1993), who succeeded in the peerage.

References

1881 births
1966 deaths
Barons in the Peerage of the United Kingdom
14th King's Hussars officers
High Sheriffs of Northumberland
Suffolk Regiment officers
British Army personnel of the Second Boer War
British Army personnel of World War I